Roy Colin Powell (30 April 1965 – 27 December 1998) was an English professional rugby league footballer who played in the 1980s and 1990s.

Background
Roy Powell was born in Dewsbury, West Riding of Yorkshire, England, and he died aged 33 in Rochdale, Greater Manchester, England.

Playing career
Powell won caps for Great Britain while at Leeds in 1985 against France (sub), in 1988 against France (2 matches), Australia (sub), Australia (2 matches), and New Zealand, in 1989 against France (2 matches), and New Zealand (2 matches), in 1990 against Papua New Guinea (2 matches), New Zealand (2 matches) (sub), New Zealand, Australia, and Australia (sub), and in 1991 against France (sub). He was selected to go on the 1988 Great Britain Lions tour.

Powell played left- in Leeds' 33–12 victory over Castleford in the 1988 Yorkshire Cup Final during the 1988–89 season at Elland Road, Leeds on Sunday 16 October 1988. Powell played left- in Leeds' 14–15 defeat by St. Helens in the 1987–88 John Player Special Trophy Final during the 1987–88 season at Central Park, Wigan on Saturday 9 January 1988, and played right- in Leeds' 8–15 defeat by Wigan in the 1992–93 Regal Trophy Final during the 1992–93 season at Elland Road, Leeds on Saturday 23 January 1993. Powell played in Batley's victory over Oldham in the 1998–99 Trans-Pennine Cup Final during the 1998–99 season.

He collapsed and died of a cardiac arrest at the age of 33, while on his way to take part in a training session for Rochdale Hornets on 27 December 1998.

References

External links
!Great Britain Statistics at englandrl.co.uk (statistics currently missing due to not having appeared for both Great Britain, and England)
(archived by web.archive.org) Profile at leedsrugby.dnsupdate.co.uk
(archived by web.archive.org) Crooks in trouble
(archived by web.archive.org) When Britain defeated the Aussies
Obituary at independent.co.uk
Photograph "Roy Powell on the burst - Roy Powell was a tireless and most enthusiastic player. A true gentleman of the game. He played 132 times for Northern from 1992 until he moved on to Featherstone in 1995. Roy tragically died two days after Christmas whilst training with Batley (sic) in 1998 aged 33 – 01/01/1993" at rlhp.co.uk

1965 births
1998 deaths
Batley Bulldogs players
Black British sportsmen
Bradford Bulls players
English rugby league players
Featherstone Rovers players
Great Britain national rugby league team players
Great Britain under-21 national rugby league team players
Leeds Rhinos players
Rochdale Hornets players
Rugby league players from Dewsbury
Rugby league props
Rugby league second-rows
Yorkshire rugby league team players